Clarendon County School District is located in Clarendon County, South Carolina.

See also 
 Briggs v. Elliott

References

Education in Clarendon County, South Carolina
School districts in South Carolina